Põhja-Tallinn is an Estonian hip hop band. The band was established in 2007.

In 2013, the band won one award in Estonian Music Awards, namely, in the category "best band of the year".

Members
Jaanus Saks (Aka Wild Disease) (Vocal)

Kaspar Raudkivi (Aka Mini) (Vocal)

Alvar Risto Vürst (Aka Fate) (Vocal)

Carlos Roos (Guitar)

Robert Loigom (Drums)

Hannes Agur Vellend (Bassguitar)

Maia Vahtramäe (Vocal)

Kenneth Rüütli (Aka Kenny/Kenito) (Vocal)

Discography

Albums
2012 "Per Aspera Ad Astra" (Masterhead Records)		
2013 "Maailm Meid Saadab" (Masterhead Records)		
2015 "Regeneratsioon" (Masterhead Records)		
2017 "Alati Olemas" (Masterhead Records)

References

Estonian musical groups